Abthugni (or) was an ancient city in Roman North Africa at present day Suwar (Henchir-es-Souar) in Tunisia.  It was, in Roman times, in the province of Africa Proconsularis, Africa, and latter in Byzacena. In late antiquity Abthugni was also the seat of a bishop, and the diocese is a titular see of the Roman Catholic Church to this day.

Location
It was a suffran of Carthage. According to Ferchiou, the name of the place is to be reconstructed as Abtugnos.

History
The city was probably founded in the 3rd century BC, and was well established by 30 BC.

Numerous inscriptions have been found documenting the history of Abthugni 

The Roman consul Gaius Rutilius Gallicus performed survey work near Abthugni during the reign of Vespasian. Hadrian made Abthugni a city of Municipium status.

During the Diocletian Persecution the city's Christian community is said to have meet near a cemetery outside the city area, to avoid the jurisdiction of the town officials. In the 4th century during the time of the emperor Valens some of the public buildings were restored. 

The town was a Byzantine fortress in late antiquity.

Archaeology
There are a few ruins of the city, including several temples, baths and tombs. The first investigations at the Capitolium of Abthugnos were undertaken by Gauckler and Cagnat at the end of the 19th century. Ernest Babelon lists many preserved buildings, including two temples, the Byzantine city wall, a rectangular basin, and a mausoleum. Recent work was led by Nadié Ferchiou, in the course of which the entire Forum area and the Capitolium were excavated.

Considerable ruins in the Byzantine enclosure include two temples, including a capitol and a rectangular pool which is accessed by thirteen steps. There is also a mausoleum and great many ruined monuments.

Bishopric
The city was the seat of an ancient bishopric. Known bishops include *Felix of Aptunga, one of three bishops who consecrated Cæcilianus, therefore precipitating the Donatist controversy. The proto-Donatist in Cirta called his consecration invalid,
Magnus fl. 345-348
Felix fl. 411
Saturnus fl. 525

The diocese ceased to function effectively in the late 7th century with the coming of Islamic armies. However the diocese was re-founded in name in 1933.

The current bishop is Adelio Pasqualotto who replaced Paul Henry Walshin December 2014.

References

Citations

Bibliography
 .  

Coloniae (Roman)
Roman towns and cities in Tunisia
Former populated places in Tunisia
Catholic titular sees in Africa